The Lviv International Literary Festival (Litfest) is a literary and art festival which takes place each September since 1997 within the Lviv Publishers’ Forum.
NGO "Publishers’ Forum" is the organizer.
Over the years 536 writers from 38 countries have participated in it.

History 
1997 – The Literary Festival separates from the Forum. This Festival is very popular among the youth of Western Ukraine.
2001 – Foreign guests start to participate in the Literary Festival.
2006 – The Literary Festival becomes international.

Focus themes of the Festival 
Each year a focus theme of the Festival is chosen. It unites a series of discussions and round-table meetings.
2006 – The Limits of Europe
2007 – Different Europes, Different Literatures
2008 – Literature in the Epoch of Mass-Media
2009 – Modern Literature: National vs Global
2010 – The Dialogue between Generations
2011 – Ukrainian Book Publishing Industry during the Crisis: the Time for Changes
2012 – Journeys to Literature
2013 – Women in the World That Changes
2014 – The Short 20th Century – the Great Epoch

Main events 
Contest and Festival “Young Republic of Poets”
Night of poetry and music
TRANSLIT international translation festival
CONTEXT festival of cultural management and literary criticism
Over the years 1200 events were held within the Festival. 313 events were held within the 8th Lviv International Literary Festival (2013)

Each year the Festival issues an almanac. Thematic texts and excerpts from the works of the participants are published in it. The almanac is distributed among libraries, foundations, cultural centers.

Participants 
The most famous foreign participants:
Jostein Gaarder
Zygmunt Bauman
Janusz Leon Wiśniewski
Janet Paisley
Danuta Wałęsa
Olga Tokarczuk
Martin Pollack
Erlend Loe
Marek Krajewski
Adam Michnik
Lev Rubinstein
Tatyana Tolstaya
Terézia Mora
Anna "Umka" Gerasimova
Jeremy Strong
Linor Goralik

Literary festivals in Ukraine
Culture in Lviv
Annual events in Ukraine
Autumn events in Ukraine